The Angel Orensanz Center is an art and performance space on the Lower East Side of Manhattan in New York City. It was originally built as a synagogue, running through a succession of congregations and continues to be used as one occasionally. The building is located at 172 Norfolk Street, between Stanton Street and East Houston Street. It was erected in 1849, making it the oldest surviving synagogue building in New York City, and the fourth-oldest surviving synagogue building in the United States. It was the largest synagogue in the United States at the time of its construction and is one of the few built in Gothic Revival style.

Spanish sculptor and painter Angel Orensanz purchased the property in 1986, about after 12 years after its last synagogue-owners had abandoned its use. He restored it and converted it into an art gallery and performance space known as the Angel Orensanz Foundation Center for the Arts. The New York City Landmarks Preservation Commission designated the building as a historic landmark the following year. It subsequently became home to the Shul of New York, a liberal Reform synagogue.

Its owning organizations include:

 Anshe Chesed Synagogue (Reform), its original builder, also known as the Norfolk Street Congregation (1849–1873)
 Congregation Shaari Rachmim (Gates of Mercy, Orthodox, 1873–1886)
 The First Hungarian Congregation Ohab Zedek (To Love Righteousness, Orthodox, 1886–1921)
 Sheveth Achim Anshe Slonim Synagogue (Orthodox, 1921–1974 and then abandoned)
 The city took ownership of the vandalized building (1981), after which it was sold to a succession of owners: Hungarian Development, Inc. (1983), Seashells, Inc. (1984), and finally Angel Lopez Orensanz (1986)

Structure 

The building's interior resembles that of the Cathedral of Notre-Dame in Paris. The sanctuary was designed to resemble the Sistine Chapel.

It has pointed arch tall lancet windows (originally surrounded by trefoil tracery and moldings) and doorways (surrounded by parts of moldings showing engaged columns and foliate capitals). Its larger center door is crowned by triangular molding that is almost as high as the second floor, which contains a Magen David with thin pinnacles on either side. It also has interior wooden vaults and several balconies (one of which houses Angel Orensanz's studio). It has a tripartite front facade of red stone brick, covered with stucco, framed at its top by a pointed gable. Originally, the building was three stories high and topped by concave pyramidal roofs with finials atop them; today, it is two stories high and topped by buttressed, clearly differentiated side square towers on either side of the center section. The towers were an unusual feature at the time they were built, containing articulated stairwells to the galleries. Its original ceiling was deep blue, with gold stars.

The building was designated a New York City Historic Landmark in 1987.

History

Early history
The synagogue was built by Congregation Ansche Chesed (People of Kindness). Formed in 1825, Congregation Ansche Chesed consisted primarily of German Jews, as well as Dutch Jews and Polish Jews. They were mostly recent immigrants. It was the third Jewish congregation in New York City, after Shearith Israel (1655; from which the members of Congregation Ansche Chesed broke away) and B'nai Jeshurun (1825).

Congregation Ansche Chesed purchased the three lots upon which the synagogue was built, at 172 Norfolk Street (between Stanton Street and East Houston Street), on the Lower East Side of New York City, New York, in April 1849, for $10,500 (today $). The lots had originally been part of Peter Stuyvesant's estate.

The synagogue building was designed by Eisenach (Germany)-born architect Alexander Saeltzer, who was engaged in February 1849. Saeltzer also later designed the original Astor Library (now The Public Theater) in 1851 and the Academy of Music on Astor Place in 1854. The synagogue's Gothic Revival style was inspired by the Cologne Cathedral in Cologne, Germany, and Friedrichswerdersche Kirche in Berlin. According to a 1987 report by the New York City Landmarks Preservation Commission, while Gothic architecture is closely associated with Christianity, it had also become popular with synagogues as Jewish congregations had taken over old church buildings and become accustomed to the style and viewed it as just as appropriate as any other architectural style.

The building opened in 1849 as Anshe Chesed Synagogue and was also known as the Norfolk Street Congregation. The synagogue was formally opened and consecrated on May 16, 1850, with New York City's mayor and a number of members of the New York City Common Council and Christian clergy among the invited guests. It was the largest synagogue in the United States and could hold up to 1,500 worshipers, with men on the main floor and women in the gallery. It was the first German-Jewish synagogue in New York and the second Reform synagogue after Congregation Emanu-El (1845).

Its members were traditional in their beliefs and the congregation was "moderately traditionalist." Services were conducted primarily in German. It diverged from Orthodox tradition in that its hazzan and the pulpit faced the congregation, rather than being located in the center of the congregation, and the services were accompanied by musical instruments, including an organ that was added in 1869 at the same time as family pews were introduced, with men and women sitting together. A choir of men and women was also introduced. In the 1850s, it had the largest membership of any synagogue in the United States. Munich-born Dr. Max Lilienthal was the first rabbi at the new synagogue. Dr. Jonah Bondy became the synagogue's rabbi in 1858.

In 1874, Congregation Ansche Chesed merged with Congregation Adas Jeshurun, relocated uptown to Lexington Avenue and East 63rd Street, and formed Congregation Beth El. That congregation subsequently merged into Congregation Emanu-El, in 1927.

After Ansche Chesed left, the synagogue was used by several Eastern European Orthodox Jewish congregations, which reconfigured the space to the more traditional orientation and removed the organ. It was first sold to Congregation Shaari Rachmim (Gates of Mercy) in 1873, which used it until 1886. Then, as Shaari Rachim moved to New York City's Upper West Side, the synagogue was sold to The First Hungarian Congregation Ohab Zedek (To Love Righteousness) in 1886, which used it as its home until 1921. A congregation named Sheveth Achim Anshe Slonim (People of Slonim, Belarus; founded in 1888) worshiped there from 1921 to 1974 and called it Anshe Slonim Synagogue. By 1974, membership in the synagogue had dwindled as the neighborhood changed and the Slonim community had dispersed. The synagogue was abandoned and was vandalized.

Recent history
Jewish Spanish sculptor and painter Angel Orensanz purchased the property in 1986. He restored it and converted it into an art gallery and performance space, the Angel Orensanz Foundation for the Arts, which he operated along with his brother, Al. The building was designated an historic landmark by New York City in 1987.

The Shul of New York, a liberal Reform synagogue organized in 1997 that was founded by Rabbi Emeritus Burt Siegel who originally held the Shul's Shabbat services at the synagogue and they still hold Rosh Hashanah and Yom Kippur services there.  Rabbi Susan Falk has led The Shul of New York since 2021. The Shul's services are accompanied by the Shul Band, led by Adam Feder.  It is the oldest standing synagogue in New York City.

In 1994, the controversial Andres Serrano-directed music video for Godflesh's song "Crush My Soul" was filmed in the center. Sarah Jessica Parker and Matthew Broderick were married there in 1997. Mandy Patinkin's Mamaloshen was also performed there, and Nobel Prize winner Elie Wiesel, poet Maya Angelou, playwright Arthur Miller, actress Tyne Daly, composer Philip Glass, and singers Whitney Houston and Mariah Carey have performed there. In 2003, Avril Lavigne recorded her music video for "Losing Grip" there with Liz Friedlander as the director. Taking Back Sunday's live acoustic album Live from Orensanz was recorded here in 2010. It was the venue for the 2011 live recording of MTV Unplugged by Florence + The Machine. In 2015, Venture Opera staged three performances of Mozart's opera Don Giovanni at the Orensanz Center. The same year, the center was used in the filming of an episode of Jessica Jones.

Photographer Daniel Hastings used the interior of the synagogue as the backdrop for the cover art for the Wu-Tang Clan's 1993 album "Enter the Wu-Tang (36 Chambers)".

In 2014, the building was closed for fear that the balcony would collapse, and it did not reopen for nearly a year.

References

External links 

Dutch-Jewish culture in the United States
German-Jewish culture in New York City
Polish-Jewish culture in New York City
Gothic Revival synagogues
Lower East Side
New York City Designated Landmarks in Manhattan
Synagogues in Manhattan
Synagogues completed in 1849
Reform synagogues in New York City
Orthodox synagogues in New York City
Art museums and galleries in Manhattan
Music venues in Manhattan
Gothic Revival architecture in New York City
1849 establishments in New York (state)
Religious organizations established in 1825